The Shiseido Anessa Ladies Open is an annual golf tournament on the LPGA of Japan Tour sponsored by Shiseido and Shiseido Japan. It was first played in 2019. The event is held in the first week of July in Kanagawa. The first event was hosted by Totsuka Country Club. The prize fund for 2019 was ¥120,000,000 with ¥21,600,000 going to the winner. Anessa is Shiseido's brand for its skincare products.

Winners
2022 Serena Aoki
2021 Ai Suzuki
2020 Cancelled
2019 Hinako Shibuno

References

LPGA of Japan Tour events
Golf tournaments in Japan
Sport in Kanagawa Prefecture
2019 establishments in Japan